Kuldeep Rampal Sen (born 22 October 1996) is an Indian international cricketer who plays for Madhya Pradesh in domestic cricket and Rajasthan Royals in Indian Premier League. He is a Right-Arm Fast Bowler bowler who regularly bowls speeds above 145kmph. He made his international debut in the first ODI of India's tour against Bangladesh in December 2022.

Early life

Kuldeep was born on 22 October 1996 in Hariharpur village in Rewa district of Madhya Pradesh. His father, Ram Pal Sen is a barber. Third of five children, Kuldeep started playing cricket from the age of 8. He is mentored by his coach, Aril Anthony.

Career
Sen made his first-class debut for Madhya Pradesh on 1 November 2018 in the 2018–19 Ranji Trophy. On 21 November 2018, he took his maiden five-wicket haul in first-class cricket, against Punjab. He made his Twenty20 debut for Madhya Pradesh in the 2018–19 Syed Mushtaq Ali Trophy on 24 February 2019. He made his List A debut on 25 September 2019, for Madhya Pradesh in the 2019–20 Vijay Hazare Trophy.

In February 2022, he was bought by the Rajasthan Royals in the auction for the 2022 Indian Premier League tournament.

In September 2022, he was named in the India A squad playing a 3 ODI-series against New Zealand A cricket team. 

In November 2022, he was taken as a part of India team for New Zealand 3-ODI series.

In December 2022, he made his debut for the India ODI side, playing against Bangladesh in the first of three matches. He picked two wickets on debut in a low-scoring encounter.

References

External links
 

1996 births
Living people
Indian cricketers
India One Day International cricketers
Madhya Pradesh cricketers
Rajasthan Royals cricketers